Rancé is a commune in the Ain department in eastern France. It is about 20 km north of Lyon.

Population

See also
Communes of the Ain department

References

Communes of Ain
Ain communes articles needing translation from French Wikipedia